Sir Edmund Giles Loder, 2nd Baronet (7 August 1849 – 14 April 1920) was an English aristocrat, landowner and plantsman.

Biography

Early life
Edmund Giles Loder was born on 7 August 1849 in London, England. His father was Sir Robert Loder, 1st Baronet (1823–1888), a landowner and Conservative politician, and his mother,  Maria Georgiana Busk (1826–1907). His maternal grandfather was Hans Busk (1772–1862), a Welsh poet.

He was educated at Eton College, a private boarding school in Eton, Berkshire, and graduated from Trinity College, a constituent college of the University of Cambridge.

Career
He served as a Justice of the Peace for Sussex and Northampshire.

Loder was active as a plant collector, breeder and grower. He developed hybrid rhododendrons from crosses between R. fortunei and R. griffithianum. The plants were named the Loderi hybrids and group in his honour. Three, Loderi King George, Loderi Pink Diamond and Loder's White, have received the Award of Garden Merit from the Royal Horticultural Society. He developed the garden at his home at Leonardslee extensively.

Personal life
He married Marion Hubbard (1854-1922), daughter of William Egerton Hubbard. They had two children:
 Patience Marion Loder (1882–1963). She married Walter William Otter (unknown-1940).
 Robert Egerton Loder (1887–1917). He married Muriel Rolls Hoare (1879–1955). They had one son:
 Sir Giles Rolls Loder, 3rd Baronet (1914–1999).

They resided at Beach House in Worthing, West Sussex. During his visits to Brighton, King Edward VII (1841–1910) would spend time in the garden at Beach House with his friend Arthur Sassoon (1840–1912). They also resided at Leonardslee in Lower Beeding near Horsham in West Sussex.

He died on 14 April 1920.

Bibliography
 Conifers at Leonardslee (1919).
 Edmund Loder: A memoir, with a portrait (with Sir Alfred Pease, 2nd Baronet, 1923).

References

1849 births
1920 deaths
People from London
People from Worthing
People educated at Eton College
Alumni of Trinity College, Cambridge
Baronets in the Baronetage of the United Kingdom